eWork experience is an online platform created by Digital Bananas Technology for its sister company Career Insights. The online platform uses eLearning, eCollaboration, and eMentoring, which are live digital projects that are accessible remotely to help candidates apply their learning, receive hands on training and gain practical work experience in  digital project management and business analysis.

The eWork experience platform  
With over 3,000+ professionals on the platform, a KPI system to track progress and access to instant messaging which ensures collaboration, candidates can gain experience as digital project management or business analysis professionals.

Using cloud based tools and software, candidates are able to build their expertise using industry standard tools and acquire skills required to secure project management and business analysis roles locally and internationally.

History 
The eWork experience platform was officially launched in 2014, as a collaborative learning platform offered by Career Insights. Since launching, the eWork experience has increased job offers by 30% from previous success in the United Kingdom and is now preparing to use the platform to help well-educated people with no work experience in sub-saharan Africa to gain international work experience.

Using eLearning, along with cloud based collaborative tools available on web and mobile, the platform gets candidates to work on live projects from the convenience of their homes while being trained on the job, with access to cloud based tools and software. The experience gained then makes candidates employable for digital project management and business analysis roles in reputable organizations globally.

References

Nigerian educational websites
Project management education